Events from the year 1957 in Denmark.

Incumbents
 Monarch – Frederick IX
 Prime minister – H. C. Hansen

Events
 3 March - Denmark places third in Eurovision Song Contest

Sports

Badminton
 2025 March  All England Badminton Championships
 Anni Hammergaard Hansen and Kirsten Thorndahl win gold in Women's Double
 Finn Kobberø and Kirsten Thorndahl win gold in Mixed Double.

Football
 28 April  AGF wins the 1956–57 Danish Cup by defeating Esbjerg fB 20 in the final.

Date unknown
 Fritz Pfenninger (SUI) and Jean Roth (SUI) win the Six Days of Copenhagen sox-day track cycling race.

Births
 30 March – Stig L. Andersson, landscape architect
 28 April – Tøger Seidenfaden, journalist, editor-in-chief of Politiken (died 2011)
 11 September – Preben Elkjær, footballer
 13 December – Lars Schwander, photographer, gallerist

Deaths
 2 January – Søren Absalon Larsen, physicist active in the field of electroacoustics; the Larsen effect was named after him (born 1871)
 14 April – Thorvald Madsen, physician and bacteriologist (born 1870)
 18 April – Jens Laursøn Emborg, organist and composer (born 1876)
 6 May – Ebbe Kornerup, writer and painter (born 1874)
 14 May – Thit Jensen, novelist and author of short stories, plays and society critical articles (born 1876)
 21 May – Jens Søndergaard, painter (born 1895)
 9 June – Aksel Jørgensen, painter and wood engraver (born 1883)
 17 June – Olaf Rude, painter (born 1886)
 2 September – Peter Freuchen, explorer, writer and traveller (born 1886)

Date unknown
 Axel Andersen Byrval, amateur football player and manager, national football team manager 1913–15 and 1917–18 (born 1875)

See also
1957 in Danish television

References

 
Denmark
Years of the 20th century in Denmark
1950s in Denmark